This page discusses a class of topological groups. For the wrapped loop of wire, see Solenoid.

In mathematics, a solenoid is a compact connected topological space (i.e. a continuum) that may be obtained as the inverse limit of an inverse system of topological groups and continuous homomorphisms

where each  is a circle and fi is the map that uniformly wraps the circle  for  times around the circle . This construction can be carried out geometrically in the three-dimensional Euclidean space R3. A solenoid is a one-dimensional homogeneous indecomposable continuum that has the structure of a compact topological group.

Solenoids were first introduced by Vietoris for the  case, and by van Dantzig the  case, where  is fixed. Such a solenoid arises as a one-dimensional expanding attractor, or Smale–Williams attractor, and forms an important example in the theory of hyperbolic dynamical systems.

Construction

Geometric construction and the Smale–Williams attractor 

Each solenoid may be constructed as the intersection of a nested system of embedded solid tori in R3.

Fix a sequence of natural numbers {ni}, ni ≥ 2. Let T0 = S1 × D be a solid torus. For each i ≥ 0, choose a solid torus Ti+1 that is wrapped longitudinally ni times inside the solid torus Ti. Then their intersection

 

is homeomorphic to the solenoid constructed as the inverse limit of the system of circles with the maps determined by the sequence {ni}.

Here is a variant of this construction isolated by Stephen Smale as an example of an expanding attractor in the theory of smooth dynamical systems. Denote the angular coordinate on the circle S1 by t (it is defined mod 2π) and consider the complex coordinate z on the two-dimensional unit disk D. Let f be the map of the solid torus T = S1 × D into itself given by the explicit formula

 

This map is a smooth embedding of T into itself that preserves the foliation by meridional disks (the constants 1/2 and 1/4 are somewhat arbitrary, but it is essential that 1/4 < 1/2 and 1/4 + 1/2 < 1). If T is imagined as a rubber tube, the map f stretches it in the longitudinal direction, contracts each meridional disk, and wraps the deformed tube twice inside T with twisting, but without self-intersections. The hyperbolic set Λ of the discrete dynamical system (T, f) is the intersection of the sequence of nested solid tori described above, where Ti is the image of T under the ith iteration of the map f. This set is a one-dimensional (in the sense of topological dimension) attractor, and the dynamics of f on Λ has the following interesting properties:

 meridional disks are the stable manifolds, each of which intersects Λ over a Cantor set
 periodic points of f are dense in Λ
 the map f is topologically transitive on Λ

General theory of solenoids and expanding attractors, not necessarily one-dimensional, was developed by R. F. Williams and involves a projective system of infinitely many copies of a compact branched manifold in place of the circle, together with an expanding self-immersion.

Construction in toroidal coordinates 
In the toroidal coordinates with radius , the solenoid can be parametrized by  aswhere

Here,  are adjustable shape-parameters, with constraint . In particular,  works.

This allows us to construct the inverse limit maps explicitly:

Construction by symbolic dynamics 
Viewed as a set, the solenoid is just a Cantor-continuum of circles, wired together in a particular way. This suggests to us the construction by symbolic dynamics, where we start with a circle as a "racetrack", and append an "odometer" to keep track of which circle we are on.

Define  as the solenoid. Next, define addition on the odometer , in the same way as p-adic numbers. 

Pathological properties 

Solenoids are compact metrizable spaces that are connected, but not locally connected or path connected. This is reflected in their pathological behavior with respect to various homology theories, in contrast with the standard properties of homology for simplicial complexes. In Čech homology, one can construct a non-exact long homology sequence using a solenoid. In Steenrod-style homology theories, the 0th homology group of a solenoid may have a fairly complicated structure, even though a solenoid is a connected space.

See also
Protorus, a class of topological groups that includes the solenoids
Pontryagin duality
Inverse limit
p-adic number
Profinite integer

References 

 D. van Dantzig, Ueber topologisch homogene Kontinua,  Fund. Math. 15  (1930), pp. 102–125
 
 Clark Robinson, Dynamical systems: Stability, Symbolic Dynamics and Chaos, 2nd edition, CRC Press, 1998 
 S. Smale, Differentiable dynamical systems, Bull. of the AMS, 73 (1967), 747 – 817. 
  L. Vietoris, Über den höheren Zusammenhang kompakter Räume und eine Klasse von zusammenhangstreuen Abbildungen, Math. Ann. 97 (1927), pp. 454–472
 Robert F. Williams, Expanding attractors, Publ. Math. IHES, t. 43 (1974), p. 169–203

Further reading

Topological groups
Continuum theory
Algebraic topology
Ring theory
Number theory
P-adic numbers